Giuseppe Perrone (born 19 May 1975) is a Swiss footballer, born in Arbon. He currently plays for Trapani Calcio.

Career
Giuseppe Perrone started his career with Foggia in serie A during the 1993-94 season but he did not play any football match and at the end of the season he went playing in a lower league; Serie C2 with the football team Bisceglie.

In the 1997-98 season he returns to Foggia and plays 31 matches in Serie B. In the Following season with Foggia he scores 11 goals in Serie C1.

Perrone plays again in Serie B with Pistoiese in the 2000-01 season and in the 2001-02 season.

For the 2009-10 season he plays in Serie D with Trapani where he scores 20 times; his largest number of goals for one season. In the following season he still plays with Trapani where he scores 14 times which made him as the top scorer of 2010–11 Lega Pro Seconda Divisione and one of the most prolific forward of Trapani Calcio ever.

References

External links 
 

1975 births
Living people
Swiss men's footballers
Swiss expatriate footballers
Calcio Foggia 1920 players
Ascoli Calcio 1898 F.C. players
U.S. Pistoiese 1921 players
Trapani Calcio players
A.C. Sansovino players
A.S.D. Olimpia Colligiana players
Cosenza Calcio 1914 players
S.P.A.L. players
Latina Calcio 1932 players
F.C. Südtirol players
Serie B players
Expatriate footballers in Italy
Association football forwards
People from Arbon
A.S. Bisceglie Calcio 1913 players
Sportspeople from Thurgau